Kawas is a town and union council of Ziarat District in the Balochistan province of Pakistan. It is located at 30°27'56N 67°34'56E and has an altitude of 2116m (6945ft). The indigenous tribes over here are Kakar and Tareen (including Raisani).

References

Populated places in Ziarat District
Union councils of Balochistan, Pakistan